David Bagrationi, also known as David the Regent (1 July 1767 in Tbilisi, Georgia – 13 May 1819 in Saint Petersburg, Russia), was a Georgian royal prince (batonishvili), writer and scholar, was a regent of the Kingdom of Kartl-Kakheti, eastern Georgia, from December 28, 1800 to January 18, 1801.

The eldest son of the last Kartli-Kakhetian, King George XII by his first wife Ketevan Andronikashvili, he was educated in Russia (1787–1789), and served there as a colonel of the Russian army from 1797 to 1798. He was proclaimed as Heir Apparent by his father on February 22, 1799 and confirmed by the Russian Tsar Paul I, an official protector of Georgia, on 18 April 1799. In 1800, he attempted to modernize the law and administration. He became a lieutenant general the same year.

On his father's death in December 1800, David became the head of the Royal House of Bagrationi but was not allowed to ascend the throne of Kartli-Kakheti. David ruled briefly between the time of his father's death (December 28, 1800) and the arrival of General Knorring (May 24, 1801). In November 1800 the Russian Tsar had prohibited him from doing that without Russian consent. On January 18, 1801 he was surprised by a decree of Paul I declaring the annexation of the Kingdom to the Russian Empire. He tried to remain in power as de facto head of state. In May 1801 Russian General Carl Heinrich Knorring removed him from power and established a provisional government headed by General Ivan Petrovich Lasarev. Prince David was brought to St Petersburg under a military escort on February 18, 1803. From 1812 to 1819, he held a seat in the Senate of the Russian Empire.

He married in 1800 Princess Elene Abamelik (1770—1836), and died childless in 1819. He was buried at the Alexander Nevsky Monastery.

Influenced by the ideas of French Enlightenment, he was the first Georgian translator of Voltaire. He was also an author of a research on Georgian history (Georgian, 1814), Review of the Georgian Law (Russian, 1811—1816), Abridged Manual of Physics (Georgian, 1818), and several poems.

Ancestry

References 

Politicians from Tbilisi
Male writers from Georgia (country)
19th-century historians from Georgia (country)
Bagrationi dynasty of the Kingdom of Kartli-Kakheti
David Bagrationi
1767 births
1819 deaths
Writers from Tbilisi
Regents of Georgia
Imperial Russian Army generals
Georgian generals in the Imperial Russian Army
Georgian lieutenant generals (Imperial Russia)
18th-century viceregal rulers
19th-century viceregal rulers
18th-century historians from Georgia (country)
Heirs apparent who never acceded
Burials at the Feodorovskaya Church of the Alexander Nevsky Lavra